The Medal of the Red Cross is a royal decoration of the Kingdom of the Netherlands to award those who dedicated themselves to and showed important deeds towards the Netherlands Red Cross.

The medal is also named the Dutch government medal because the medal is not created by the Netherlands or international Red Cross, but created by royal decree on 5 October 1910 by the Dutch government. Thereby this medal is an official Dutch royal decoration.

Orders, decorations, and medals of the Netherlands
Awards established in 1910
1910 establishments in the Netherlands
Netherlands